Slidell High School is a public school for grades nine through twelve located in Slidell, Louisiana, United States.  It is part of the St. Tammany Parish Public School District and serves portions of west and central Slidell as well as a section of Lacombe.

Athletics
Slidell High athletics competes in the LHSAA.

Notable alumni
 Brett Bech, former NFL player
 Reggie Cooper, former NFL player
 Matt Forte, former NFL running back for the Chicago Bears and New York Jets
 Will Harris, current MLB player (Houston Astros)
 Xavier Paul, Major League Baseball outfielder who currently plays for the Cincinnati Reds
J. Kevin Pearson (1977), Louisiana state representative, 2007–2019, District 76

References

Public high schools in Louisiana
Schools in St. Tammany Parish, Louisiana
Slidell, Louisiana
Educational institutions established in 1908
1908 establishments in Louisiana